Saulxures-sur-Moselotte (literally Saulxures on Moselotte) is a commune in the Vosges department in Grand Est in northeastern France.

It is situated between Remiremont and La Bresse, just off the D43 road, within the Parc Naturel Régional des Ballons.

The main local industries are timber, stone- and wood-working and textiles. Leisure activities offer walking in the wooded hills and the local lake.

See also
Communes of the Vosges department

References

External links

 Official site (in French)

Communes of Vosges (department)